The Pyeongwon Line was a railway line in Korea, opened in 1941 during the period of Japanese rule. The line connected Pyongyang to Gowon. It exists now North Korea and forms part of the following present day lines:

 Seopo to Tongbungri, Ryongsŏng Line
 Tongbungri to Gowon, Pyeongra Line

History

The railway line was constructed by the Chosen Government Railway. The first interval between Seopo and Sainjang was opened on 1 November 1927, and the construction of the entire line was completed on 1 April 1941. When first opened, the western section of the line was called West Pyeongwon Line, and was extended as follows:

The eastern section was originally called East Pyongwon Line, and was extended as follows:

When the eastern and western sections were joined, the  line was renamed Pyeongwon Line.

After the establishment of the DPRK, the Pyeongwon Line became part of the Pyeongra Line.

Route

References

 Kokubu, Hayato (2007). 将軍様の鉄道 [The railway of the general] (in Japanese). Tokyo: Shinchosha, .
 Japanese Government Railways (1937). 鉄道停車場一覧. 昭和12年10月1日現在 [The List of the Stations as of 1 October 1937] (in Japanese). Tokyo: Kawaguchi Printing Company. p496

Railway lines in Korea
Sentetsu railway lines